Elizabeth Palmer is a journalist.

Elizabeth Palmer is also the name of:

Elizabeth Mary Palmer (1832–1897), New Zealand singer, music teacher, and composer
Elizabeth Palmer (figure skater) in 2006 U.S. Figure Skating Championships
Elizabeth Palmer (schooner) from List of shipwrecks in January 1915
Elizabeth Palmer, recipient of Primetime Emmy Award for Outstanding Costumes for a Series
Elizabeth Palmer (activist) (1913-2014) YWCA

See also
Betsy Palmer (1926–2015), American actress
Elizabeth Palmer Peabody (1804–1894), American educator